Stenoma chloroxantha is a moth of the family Depressariidae. It is found in Brazil (Rio Grande do Sul).

The wingspan is about 21 mm. The forewings are light ochreous brown, with a faint pinkish tinge. The plical stigma forms a round pale green spot edged with fuscous, the second discal an indistinct pale green dot. There is a light yellow triangular terminal patch, extending on the dorsum to two-thirds and narrowed to a point at the apex, edged with slight fuscous suffusion anteriorly, marked with a fine light yellow brown slightly curved line from the anterior edge above the middle to the dorsum before the tornus, and a terminal series of brownish dots. The hindwings are pale grey.

References

Moths described in 1925
Taxa named by Edward Meyrick
Stenoma